Neotrichoporoides is genus in the family Eulophidae, containing approximately 70 species.

References

Key to Nearctic eulophid genera
Universal Chalcidoidea Database

Eulophidae